Reddyanus jayarathnei is a species of scorpion in the family Buthidae endemic to Sri Lanka.

Etymology
The species name is named after V. A. Sanjeewa Jayarathne, who is the person that collected the type specimen of the scorpion.

Description
Total length is about 37.1 mm in female and 45.5 mm in male. Male has slightly longer metasomal segments and telson than female. Pedipalp movable finger is longer than manus of chela. Pedipalps, legs, femur and patella are covered with brown maculation. First metasomal segment has 10 carinae, whereas second through fourth segments have eight carinae. The fifth segment bears five carinae in female, but male has only three to five carinae. Subaculear
tooth is wide and rounded. Female has 12 pectinal teeth, but male has 14 pectinal teeth. Both mesosoma and carapace are dark black with yellow to reddish spots. Chelicera are strongly reticulated, with spotted fingers. Pedipalps, legs, femur and patella are reddish, with brown to black spots. Pedipalp chela fingers are reddish black. Metasomal segments are reddish brown with the spots. Telson also reddish with brown spots. Carapace lacks carinae but covered with large granules. Mesosoma has granulated median carina.

References

Animals described in 2016
jayarathnei